Haplogroup T-M184, also known as Haplogroup T, is a human Y-chromosome DNA haplogroup. The unique-event polymorphism that defines this clade is the single-nucleotide polymorphism known as M184.

T-M184 is unusual in that it is both geographically widespread and relatively rare. T1 (T-L206) – the numerically dominant primary branch of T-M184 – appears to have originated in Western Asia, and possibly spread from there into East Africa, South Asia, Europe and adjoining regions. T1* may have expanded with the Pre-Pottery Neolithic B culture (PPNB). 

Subclades of T-M70 appear to have been present in Europe since the Neolithic, having arrived there with the Early European Farmers (EEF).

Structure 

Subclade structure of Haplogroup T (M184).
T1 (L206)
T1a (M70/Page46/PF5662)
T1a1 (L162/Page21, L454)
T1a1a (L208/Page2)
T1a1a1 (CTS11451)
T1a1a2 (Y16897)
T1a1a2a (Z19963)
T1a2 (L131)
T1a2a (PH141/Y13244)
T1a2b (L446)
T1a3 (FGC1350/Y11151 )
T1a3a (Y11675/Z9798)
T1a3b (FGC1340/Y8614)
T2 (PH110)

Distribution

Overview

As a primary branch of haplogroup LT (a.k.a. K1), the basal, undivergent haplogroup T* currently has the alternate phylogenetic name of  K1b and is a sibling of haplogroup L* (a.k.a. K1a). (Before 2008, haplogroup T and its subclades were known as haplogroup K2. The name K2 has since been reassigned to a primary subclade of haplogroup K.) It has two primary branches: T1 (T-L206) and T2 (T-PH110). Most males who now belong to haplogroup T1* carry the subclade T-M70 (T1a), a primary branch of T-M206. 

Haplogroup T is found at exceptionally high levels amongst the Dir and Isaaq clans in the Somaliland, Djibouti, and Ethiopia. it is also found at relatively high levels in specific populations in other parts of the world. These include Kurru, Bauris and Lodha in South Asia; among Toubou in Chad; and in a significant minority of Rajus and Mahli in South Asia; general Somalis, southern Egyptians and Fula (Fulbe) in north Cameroon; people from the Chian, Aquilani, Saccensi, Ibizan (Eivissenc) and Mirandese regions in Europe; Zoroastrians, Bakhtiaris in the Middle East, and Nenets and Kazakhs (especially Momyns and Argyns) in Siberia/Central Asia. 

The maximal worldwide frequency for haplogroup T-M184 is 100%, amongst Dir clan Somali males (Iacovacci et al. 2016). It accounts for approximately 82.4% of Somali male lineages overall in Dire Dawa, Ethiopia (Plaster et al. 2011). Geographically, it is found at the highest levels in the Dire Dawa area of Ethiopia, and Djibouti.

Luis et al. (2004) suggest that the presence of T on the African continent may, like R1* representatives, point to an older introduction from Asia. The Levant rather than the Arabian Peninsula appears to have been the main route of entry, as the Egyptian and Turkish haplotypes are considerably older in age (13,700 BP and 9,000 BP, respectively) than those found in Oman (only 1,600 BP). According to the authors, the spotty modern distribution pattern of haplogroup T-M184 within Africa may therefore represent the traces of a more widespread early local presence of the clade. Later expansions of populations carrying the E1b1b, E1b1a, G and J NRY lineages may have overwhelmed the T-M184 clade-bearers in certain localities.

In the Caucasus and Anatolia it makes up to 4% of the population in southeast and northwest Caucasus as well as in southeast and western Anatolia, peaking up to 20% in Armenians from Sasun. In Middle East it makes up to 4% of the population around the Zagros Mountains and the Persian Gulf as well as around the Taurus Mountains and the Levant basin, peaking up to 10% in Zoroastrians from Kerman, Bakhtiaris, Assyrians from Azerbaijan, Abudhabians, Armenians from Historical Southwestern Armenia and Druzes from Galilee. In Eastern Africa, it makes up to 4% of the population on Upper Egypt peaking up to 10% in Luxor.

Haplogroup T is uncommon in Europe, except in Southern Europe and adjoining areas. According to Mendez et al. (2011), "the occurrence in Europe of lineages belonging to both T1a1 (old T1a) and T1a2 (old T1b) subclades probably reflects multiple episodes of gene flow. T1a1* haplogroups in Europe likely reflect older gene flow". It makes up to 4% of the population on Central Italy, Western Sicily, Northwest Corsica, Northwestern Iberian Peninsula, Western Andalucia, Western Alps, Eastern Crete, and Macedonia, frequencies up to 10% in Ibiza, Miranda de I Douro, Eastern Oviedo, Cádiz, Badajoz, Balagna, Norma and Ragusa, and peaking at 20% in Sciacca, L'Aquila and some German southern regions. T-M184 was found in 1.7% (10/591) of a pool of six samples of males from southwestern Russia, but it was completely absent from a pool of eight samples totalling 637 individuals from the northern half of European Russia. The Russians from the southwest were from the following cities: Roslavl, Livny, Pristen, Repyevka, and Belgorod; and Kuban Cossacks from the Republic of Adygea.

T1 (T*) 

T1 is the most common descent of T-M184 haplogroup, being the lineage of more than 95% of all Eurasian T-M184 members. One of their descent lineages is found in high frequencies among northern Somali clans. However, it appears to have originated somewhere around the Eastern Mediterranean Basin, perhaps somewhere between Israel to the Jordan Valley.

The basal T1* subclade appears to have spread to northeastern Anatolia, from the Levant at least, with the Pre-Pottery Neolithic B culture (PPNB). Although it is rare in modern populations, T1* has been found in a Berber individual from Tunisia, a male in Syria, and one sequence among ethnic Macedonians in Macedonia.

T1a (M70) 
Mendez et al. (2011) points to an ancient presence for T1a-M70 in Europe may reflect early exiles between the ancient lands of Israel and Babylon. The subclade probably arrived with the very first farmers.

T1a1* 

The Pityusans of the Pityusic Islands (Ibiza and Formentera) – have been found by three different studies to possess T1a1 at relatively high levels of 6.7–16.7%. Tomàs et al. (2006) found three cases amongst a sample of 45 (6.7%). Zalloua et al. (2008) found nine examples that were L454+ (an SNP equivalent to L162/Page21)  from a sample of 54 (i.e. a rate of 16.7%). Rodriguez et al. (2009) found seven cases of L454+ in a sample of 96 (7.3%).

The Pontic Greeks of Anatolia are also reported to possess T1a1. In 2009, a male with the surname Metaxopoulos and a Pontic Greek background was reported to be T-L162(xL208) – according to the Y-Chromosome Genome Comparison Project administered by Adriano Squecco. Greeks from the Fatsa (originally "Φάτσα") reportedly migrated in antiquity from Sinope, which was itself colonised by Ionians (from Miletus). Another ancient Ionian colony in north-west Anatolia, Lámpsakos (Lampsacus), had onomastic links to the Pityusic Islands (see above) – Lámpsakos was originally an Ionian colony known as Pityussa.

T1a1a (L208)

This lineage, formed 14,200-11,000 BP, is the largest branch downstream T1a1-L162. Firstly discovered and reported at August 2009 in a 23andMe customer of Iberian ancestry that participated in the public Squecco's Y-Chromosome Genome Comparison Project and appearing there as "Avilés" and as "AlpAstur" in 23andMe. Named as "L208" at November 2009.

T1a1a1a1b1a1* (T-Y3782*)
One Sardinian male from a sample of 187 (a nominal rate of 0.53%)  – a resident of the Province of Cagliari (Sardinian: Casteddu) – has been found to have T-Y3782(xY3836), also known T1a1a1a1b1a1(xT1a1a1a1b1a1a).

T1a1a1a1b1a1a (T-Y3836)

This lineage is mostly found among individuals from the Iberian Peninsula, where the subclade also has its highest diversity.  Two subclades can be clearly discriminated. The first, found mainly in post-colonial Puerto Rico, with DYS391=10 and the second, found mainly in Panamá where their Iberian descendants could have the entrance point to America, with DYS439=12.

Some members of Y3836 are found among different communities of the Sephardic diaspora but they are found to be extremely rare in the total percentage of some of these communities as seen in Nogueiro et al. This probably could mean that these members could be integrated by these communities through the contact with other native Iberian populations as seen in Monteiro et al. where this lineage was found among native Astur-Leonese speakers.

T2 (PH110) 
 This lineage could have arrived in the Levant through the PPNB expansion from northeastern Anatolia.

A 2014 study found T-PH110 in one ethnic Bhutanese male, out of a sample of 21, possibly implying a rate of 4.8% in Bhutan. Also have been found in a German individual and another two from Caucasus. The Bhutanese and the German haplotypes seems to cluster together.

Possible cases from older research

Modern geographical distribution

Northern Asia

Europe 

With K-M9+, unconfirmed but probable T-M70+: 14% (3/23) of Russians in Yaroslavl, 12.5% (3/24) of Italians in Matera, 10.3% (3/29) of Italians in Avezzano, 10% (3/30) of Tyroleans in Nonstal, 10% (2/20) of Italians in Pescara, 8.7% (4/46) of Italians in Benevento, 7.8% (4/51) of Italians in South Latium, 7.4% (2/27) of Italians in Paola, 7.3% (11/150) of Italians in Central-South Italy, 7.1% (8/113) of Serbs in Serbia, 4.7% (2/42) of Aromanians in Romania, 3.7% (3/82) of Italians in Biella, 3.7% (1/27) of Andalusians in Córdoba, 3.3% (2/60) of Leoneses in León, 3.2% (1/31) of Italians in Postua, 3.2% (1/31) of Italians in Cavaglià, 3.1% (3/97) of Calabrians in Reggio Calabria, 2.8% (1/36) of Russians in Ryazan Oblast, 2.8% (2/72) of Italians in South Apulia, 2.7% (1/37) of Calabrians in Cosenza, 2.6% (3/114) of Serbs in Belgrade, 2.5% (1/40) of Russians in Pskov, 2.4% (1/42) of Russians in Kaluga, 2.2% (2/89) of Transylvanians in Miercurea Ciuc, 2.2% (2/92) of Italians in Trino Vercellese, 1.9% (2/104) of Italians in Brescia, 1.9% (2/104) of Romanians in Romania, 1.7% (4/237) of Serbs and Montenegrins in Serbia and Montenegro, 1.7% (1/59) of Italians in Marche, 1.7% (1/59) of Calabrians in Catanzaro, 1.6% (3/183) of Greeks in Northern Greece, 1.3% (2/150) of Swiss Germans in Zürich Area, 1.3% (1/79) of Italians in South Tuscany and North Latium, 1.1% (1/92) of Dutch in Leiden, 0.5% (1/185) of Serbs in Novi Sad (Vojvodina), 0.5% (1/186) of Polish in Podlasie

Other parts that have been found to contain a significant proportion of haplogroup T-M184 individuals include Trentino (2/67 or 3%), Mariña Lucense (1/34 or 2.9%), Heraklion (3/104 or 2.9%), Roslavl (3/107 or 2.8%), Ourense (1/37 or 2.7%), Livny (3/110 or 2.7%), Biella (3/114 or 2.6%), Entre Douro (6/228 or 2.6%), Porto (3/118 or 2.5%), Urbino (1/40 or 2.5%), Iberian Peninsula (16/629 or 2.5%), Blekinge/Kristianstad (1/41 or 2.4%), Belarus (1/41 or 2.4%), Modena (3/130 or 2.3%), Provence-Alpes-Côte d'Azur (1/45 or 2.2%), Pristen (1/45 or 2.2%), Cáceres (2/91 or 2.2%), Brac (1/47 or 2.1%), Satakunta (1/48 or 2.1%), Western Croatia (2/101 or 2%), Ukrainia (1/50 or 2%), Greifswald (2/104 or 1.9%), Moldavians in Sofia (1/54 or 1.9%), Uppsala (1/55 or 1.8%), Lublin (2/112 or 1.8%), Pias in Beja (1/54 or 1.8%), Macedonian Greeks (1/57 or 1.8%), Nea Nikomedeia (1/57 or 1.8%), Sesklo/Dimini (1/57 or 1.8%), Lerna/Franchthi (1/57 or 1.8%), Açores (2/121 or 1.7%), Viana do Castelo (1/59 or 1.7%), Toulouse (1/67 or 1.5%), Belgorod (2/143 or 1.4%), Sardinia (1/77 or 1.3%). According to data from commercial testing, 3.9% of Italian males belonging to this haplogroup. Approximately 3% of Sephardi Jews and 2% of Ashkenazi Jews belong to haplogroup T.

Middle East and Caucasus 
Haplogroup T has some significant frequencies in southeast and eastern Anatolia, the Zagros Mountains and both sides of the Persian Gulf.

There are also unconfirmed reports of T-M70+ amongst 28% (7/25) of Lezginians in Dagestan, 21.7% (5/23) of Ossetians in Zamankul, 14% (7/50) of Iranians in Isfahan, 13% (3/23) of Ossetians in Zil'ga, 12.6% (11/87) of Kurmanji Kurds in Eastern Turkey, 11.8% (2/17) of Palestinian Arabs in Palestine, 8.3% (1/12) of Iranians in Shiraz, 8.3% (2/24) of Ossetians in Alagir, 8% (2/25) of Kurmanji Kurds in Georgia, 7.5% (6/80) of Iranians in Tehran, 7.4% (10/135) of Palestinian Arabs in Israeli Village, 7% (10/143) of Palestinian Arabs in Israel and Palestine, 5% (1/19) of Chechens in Chechenia, 4.2% (3/72) of Azerbaijanians in Azerbaijan, 4.1% (2/48) of Iranians in Isfahan, 4% (4/100) of Armenians in Armenia, 4% (1/24) of Bedouins in Israel and 2.6% (1/39) of Turks in Ankara.

Africa 
Fossils excavated at the Late Neolithic site of Kelif el Boroud in Morocco, which have been radiocarbon-dated to around 3,000 BCE, have been found to belong to haplogroup T-M184.

South Asia 

T1a-M70 in India has been considered to be of West Eurasian origin.

With K-M9+, unconfirmed but probable T-M70+: 56.6% (30/53) of Kunabhis in Uttar Kannada, 32.5% (13/40) of Kammas in Andhra Pradesh, 26.8% (11/41) of Brahmins in Visakhapatnam, 25% (1/4) of Kattunaiken in South India, 22.4% (11/49) of Telugus in Andhra Pradesh, 20% (1/5) of Ansari in South Asia, (2/20) of Poroja in Andhra Pradesh, 9.8% (5/51) of Kashmiri Pandits in Kashmir, 8.2% (4/49) of Gujars in Kashmir, 7.7% (1/13) of Siddis (migrants from Ethiopia) in Andhra Pradesh, 5.5% (3/55) of Adi in Northeast India, 5.5% (7/128) of Pardhans in Adilabad, 5.3% (2/38) of Brahmins in Bihar, 4.3% (1/23) of Bagata in Andhra Pradesh, 4.2% (1/24) of Valmiki in Andhra Pradesh, (1/32) of Brahmins in Maharashtra, 3.1% (2/64) of Brahmins in Gujarat, 2.9% (1/35) of Rajput in Uttar Pradesh, 2.3% (1/44) of Brahmins in Peruru, and 1.7% (1/59) of Manghi in Maharashtra.

Also in Desasth-Brahmins in Maharashtra (1/19 or 5.3%) and Chitpavan-Brahmins in Konkan (1/21 or 4.8%), Chitpavan-Brahmins in Konkan (2/66 or 3%).

Central Asia & East Asia 

Unconfirmed but probable T-M70+: 2% (4/204) of Hui in Liaoning (China), and 0.9% (1/113) of Bidayuh in Sarawak.

Americas (post-colonisation)

Ancient DNA

Ancient DNA from 'Ain Ghazal 

Haplogroup T is found among the later middle Pre-Pottery Neolithic B (PPNB) inhabitants from the 'Ain Ghazal archaeological site (in modern Jordan). It was not found among the early and middle PPNB populations. It is thought that the Pre-Pottery Neolithic B population is mostly composed of two different populations: members of early Natufian civilisation and a population resulting from immigration from the north, i.e. north-eastern Anatolia. However, Natufians have been found to belong mostly to the E1b1b1b2 lineage – which is found among 60% of the whole PPNB population and 75% of the 'Ain Ghazal population, being present in all three middle PPNB stages. 

Later middle PPNB populations in the Southern Levant were already witnessing severe changes in climate that would have been exacerbated by large population demands on local resources. Beginning at 8.9 cal ka BP we see a significant decrease in population in highland Jordan, ultimately leading to the complete abandonment of almost all central settlements in this region.

The 9th millennium Pre-Pottery Neolithic B (PPNB) period in the Levant represents a major transformation in prehistoric lifeways from small bands of mobile hunter–gatherers to large settled farming and herding villages in the Mediterranean zone, the process having been initiated some 2–3 millennia earlier.

'Ain Ghazal (" Spring of the Gazelles") is situated in a relatively rich environmental setting immediately adjacent to the Wadi Zarqa, the longest drainage system in highland Jordan. It is located at an elevation of about 720m within the ecotone between the oak-park woodland to the west and the open steppe-desert to the east.

Evidence recovered from the excavations suggests that much of the surrounding countryside was forested and offered the inhabitants a wide variety of economic resources. Arable land is plentiful within the site's immediate environs. These variables are atypical of many major neolithic sites in the Near East, several of which are located in marginal environments. Yet despite its apparent richness, the area of 'Ain Ghazal is climatically and environmentally sensitive because of its proximity throughout the Holocene to the fluctuating steppe-forest border.

The Ain Ghazal settlement first appear in the middle PPNB, which is split into two phases. Phase 1 starts 10300 yBP and ends 9950 yBP, phase 2 ends 9550 yBP.

The estimated population of the middle PPNB site from ‘Ain Ghazal is of 259-1,349 individuals with an area of 3.01-4.7 ha. Is argued that at its founding at the commencement of the middle PPNB ‘Ain Ghazal was likely 2 ha in size and grew to 5 ha by the end of the middle PPNB. At this point in time their estimated population was 600-750 people or 125-150 people per hectare.

A 2018 study conducted by scholars from Tel-Aviv University, the Israel Antiquities Authority and Harvard University had discovered that 22 out of the 600 people who were buried in Peki'in cave from the Chalcolithic Period were of both local Levantine and Persian and Zagros area ancestries, or as phrased in the paper itself: "Ancient DNA from Chalcolithic Israel reveals the role of population mixture in cultural transformation,” the scientists concluded that the homogeneous community found in the cave could source ~57% of its ancestry from groups related to those of the local Levant Neolithic, ~26% from groups related to those of the Anatolian Neolithic, and ~17% from groups related to those of the Iran Chalcolithic.". The scholars noted that the Zagros genetic material held "Certain characteristics, such as genetic mutations contributing to blue eye color, were not seen in the DNA test results of earlier Levantine human remains MTDNA blue-eyed, fair-skinned community didn't continue, but at least now researchers have an idea why. "These findings suggest that the rise and fall of the Chalcolithic culture are probably due to demographic changes in the region".

We find that the individuals buried in Peqi’in Cave represent a
relatively genetically homogenous population. This homogeneity
is evident not only in the genome-wide analyses but also in the
fact that most of the male individuals (nine out of ten) belong to
the Y-chromosome Haplogroup T (Y-DNA), a
lineage thought to have diversified in the Near East. This
finding contrasts with both earlier (Neolithic and Epipaleolithic)
Levantine populations, which were dominated by Haplogroup E (Y-DNA),
and later Bronze Age individuals, all of whom belonged to Haplogroup J (Y-DNA).

Ancient city of Ebla
In the ancient city of Ebla in Syria in the Bronze Age, one individual was found belonging to haplogroup T-L162 (T1a1).

Alalakh Amorite city-state
One individual from Alalakh who lived circa 2014-1781 BC, belonged to haplogroup T-CTS11451 (T1a1a).

Notable haplogroup members

Elite endurance runners
Possible patterns between Y-chromosome and elite endurance runners were studied in an attempt to find a genetic explanation to the Ethiopian endurance running success. Given the superiority of East African athletes in international distance running over the past four decades, it has been speculated that they are genetically advantaged. Elite marathon runners from Ethiopia were analysed for K*(xP) which according to the previously published Ethiopian studies is attributable to the haplogroup T

According to further studies, T1a1a* (L208) was found to be proportionately more frequent in the elite marathon runners sample than in the control samples than any other haplogroup, therefore this y-chromosome could play a significant role in determining Ethiopian endurance running success. Haplogroup T1a1a* was found in 14% of the elite marathon runners sample of whom 43% of this sample are from Arsi province. In addition, haplogroup T1a1a* was found in only 4% of the Ethiopian control sample and only 1% of the Arsi province control sample. T1a1a* is positively associated with aspects of endurance running, whereas E1b1b1 (old E3b1) is negatively associated.

Thomas Jefferson

A notable member of the T-M184 haplogroup is American President Thomas Jefferson (most distant known ancestor "MDKA" is Samuel Jefferson, Born 11 October 1607 in Pettistree, Suffolk, England). The Y-chromosomal complement of the Jefferson male line was studied in 1998 in an attempt to resolve the controversy over whether he had fathered the mixed-race children of his slave Sally Hemings. A 1998 DNA study of the Y chromosome in the Jefferson male line found that it matched that of a descendant of Eston Hemings, Sally Hemings' youngest son. This confirmed the body of historical evidence, and most historians believe that Jefferson had a long-term intimate liaison with Hemings for 38 years, and fathered her six children of record, four of whom lived to adulthood. In addition, the testing conclusively disproved any connection between the Hemings descendant and the Carr male line. Jefferson grandchildren had asserted in the 19th century that a Carr nephew had been the father of Hemings' children, and this had been the basis of historians' denial for 180 years.
Jefferson's paternal family traced back Wales, where T is incredibly rare, as it is throughout Britain. A couple of British males with the Jefferson surname have been found with the third president's type of T, reinforcing the idea that his immediate paternal ancestry was British.

In 2007 the study carried out by the Turi E. King team, found that the Jefferson T patrilineage most probably belongs to an ancient and rare indigenous European group.

Phylogenetic tree

Nomenclatural history

Prior to 2002, there were in academic literature at least seven naming systems for the Y-Chromosome Phylogenetic tree. This led to considerable confusion. In 2002, the major research groups came together and formed the Y-Chromosome Consortium (YCC). They published a joint paper that created a single new tree that all agreed to use. Later, a group of citizen scientists with an interest in population genetics and genetic genealogy formed a working group to create an amateur tree aiming at being above all timely. The table below brings together all of these works at the point of the landmark 2002 YCC Tree. This allows a researcher reviewing older published literature to quickly move between nomenclatures.

Original research publications
The following research teams per their publications were represented in the creation of the YCC Tree.

α  and 

β 

γ 

δ 

ε 

ζ 

η

Y-DNA backbone tree

Notes

References

Original research

Other works cited

Sources for conversion tables

External links 
 The Y-DNA Haplogroup T Project
 YFull T YTree
 The Digital Archaeological Atlas of the 'Ain Ghazal settlement
 C14 radiocarbon CONTEXT database
 Map of the 7550ybp T1a1a-CTS4916 settlement of Malak Preslavets

T-M184